George Edward Percy Careless (September 24, 1839 – March 5, 1932) was a prominent Latter-day Saint composer and conductor.

Careless was born in London, England. As a child he studied at the Royal Academy in London.  He performed at Exeter Hall, Drury Lane and the Crystal Palace.  

In the early 1860s Careless joined the Church of Jesus Christ of Latter-day Saints and in 1864 he immigrated to Utah Territory.  It was after his ship had docked in New York City that he wrote a musical arrangement for Parley P. Pratt's hymn "The Morning Breaks, the Shadows Flee".

Shortly after coming to Salt Lake City, Careless became the conductor of the Mormon Tabernacle Choir as well as of the Salt Lake Theatre orchestra.  He also conducted performances by the Salt Lake Opera Company. Among his students was the future conductor of the Tabernacle choir, J. Spencer Cornwall.

Besides "The Morning Breaks" (hymn #1), Careless also composed the music to the following hymns in the 1985 Latter-day Saint hymnal: #40 "Arise, O Glorious Zion", #122 "Though Deepening Trials", #145 "Prayer Is the Soul's Sincere Desire", #150 "O Thou Kind and Gracious Father", #178 "O Lord of Hosts", #186 "Again We Meet Around the Board", #191 "Behold the Great Redeemer Die" and #192 "He Died! The Great Redeemer Died".

Gallery

Notes

References
Latter-day Saint biographical encyclopedia: a compilation of biographical sketches of prominent men and women in the Church of Jesus Christ of Latter-Day Saints, Volume 1, pages 738 and 739.

1839 births
1932 deaths
American Latter Day Saints
British Latter Day Saints
British male conductors (music)
Converts to Mormonism
English Latter Day Saint hymnwriters
English Latter Day Saints
English conductors (music)
English emigrants to the United States
English hymnwriters
Musicians from London
People of Utah Territory
Tabernacle Choir music directors